John Arundell or John Arundel may refer to:

Arundell of Lanherne, Cornwall
 Sir John Arundell IV (1336–1376)
 John Arundell (1366–1435), 'John The Magnificent'
 John Arundell (1392–1423), MP for Devon, 1414 and Cornwall, 1419,1421 and 1422
 John Arundell (1421–1473) of Lanherne, Sheriff of Cornwall
John Arundell (1474–1545) of Lanherne, Receiver General of the Duchy of Cornwall
 Sir John Arundell (of Lanherne, died 1557), MP for Cornwall, 1554
 John Arundell (of Lanherne, died 1590), MP for Helston, Shaftesbury, Preston and Cornwall

Arundel of Tolverne, Cornwall (descended from Lanherne)
 Sir John Arundell of Tolverne, High Sheriff of Cornwall in 1510

Arundel of Wardour, Wiltshire (descended from Lanherne)
 John Arundell, 16th Baron Arundell of Wardour (1907–1944), army officer

Arundell of Trerice, Cornwall
 Sir John Arundell (admiral) (1495–1561), Vice-admiral of the West
 Sir John Arundell (of Trerice, died 1580), his son, Cornish MP
 Sir John Arundell (born 1576) (1576–c. 1656), his son, Cornish MP and Governor of Pendennis Castle during the English Civil Wars
 John Arundell (Royalist) (1613–1644), son of the above, MP for Bodmin
 John Arundell, 2nd Baron Arundell of Trerice (1649–1698), MP for Truro
 John Arundell, 3rd Baron Arundell of Trerice (1649–1706)
 John Arundell, 4th Baron Arundell of Trerice (1701–1768)

Arundell of Sussex
 John Climping (died 1262), also known as John Arundel or John of Arundel, Bishop of Chichester, 1253–1262
 John Arundel (bishop of Chichester) or Arundell (died 1477), Bishop of Chichester, 1459–1477
 John Arundel (bishop of Exeter) (died 1504), also spelt Arundell, Bishop of Lichfield and Coventry, 1496–1502 and Exeter, 1502–1504

Others
 John Arundel (ice hockey) (1927–2002), hockey player 
 John T. Arundel (1841–1919), vice-chairman of the Pacific Islands Company, Ltd.